André Ladner (born 20 May 1962) is a Swiss former professional and international footballer who played during the 1980s and early 1990s as defender.

Club career
Ladner played his youth football with Grasshopper Club and advanced to their first team during the 1980–81 Nationalliga A season. He played for the Grasshoppers for five seasons. The first season they were runners-up in the league and during the following seasons they were champions three times in a row. To that in the 1982–83 season they won the double, winning the Swiss Cup final 3–0 against Servette.

Ladner joined FC Basel's first team in their 1985–86 season under team manager Helmut Benthaus. Ladner played his domestic league debut for his new club in the home game in the St. Jakob Stadium on 31 August 1985 as Basel won 1–0 against Sion. He scored his first goal for the club on 21 September in the Swiss Cup game as Basel won 9–1 against lower tier local club Concordia Basel. He scored his first league goal for his club on 22 March 1986 in the away game as Basel won 2–1 against Servette and it was the winning goal of the match.

He stayed with the club for two season and during this time Ladner played a total of 86 games for Basel scoring a total of six goals. 58 of these games were in the Nationalliga A, eight in the Swiss Cup and 20 were friendly games. He scored three goals in the domestic league, one in the cup and the other two were scored during the test games.

Following his time with Basel Ladner moved on to play four seasons for FC Lugano before he ended his activ playing career.

International career
Ladner was called up to play for his country in the 1982–83 season. He played his debut for Switzerland on 26 October 1983 as the Swiss won 2–0 against Yugoslavia. In total he played for matches for the Swiss team. One year later he played one game for the Swiss U-21 team.

Trainer career
Ladner later obtained his trainer license and between July 2008 and June 2010 he was assistant to Bernard Challandes by Zürich. Between January 2016 and June 2017 he was assistant to Marco Schällibaum by Aarau. Between July 2017 and June 2018 Ladner was manager of FC United Zürich. Since July 2018 Ladner has been trainer for the ladies team FC Zürich Frauen.

Honours
 Swiss champions: 1981–82, 1982–83, 1983–84
 Swiss Cup: 1982–83

References

Sources
 
 
 Die ersten 125 Jahre. Publisher: Josef Zindel im Friedrich Reinhardt Verlag, Basel. 
 Verein "Basler Fussballarchiv" Homepage

Grasshopper Club Zürich players
FC Basel players
FC Lugano players
Swiss men's footballers
Switzerland under-21 international footballers
Switzerland international footballers
Association football defenders
1962 births
Living people
Swiss Super League players
Swiss football managers

FC Aarau non-playing staff